Luca Barbarossa (born 15 April 1961, Rome) is an Italian singer-songwriter who has released 12 albums since 1981, and is known for his participation in the 1988 Eurovision Song Contest.

Early career 
In 1980, Barbarossa won the Castrocaro Music Festival, where he was spotted by a producer for the Fonit-Cetra record company, who signed him to a recording contract.  As the Castrocaro winner, he was eligible to compete in the 1981 San Remo Festival, where he finished fourth with the self-penned song "Roma spogliata".  His first self-titled album was released in the same year, and he toured as support act to Riccardo Cocciante.  The album, and the singles released from it, were not notably successful and relations soured with Fonit-Cetra, leading to Barbarossa's departure from the label.  He signed with the Italian division of the CBS label, where the decision was taken to try to establish him as a singles artist before releasing an album.  In 1986, he again participated in the San Remo Festival with "Via Margutta", but only managed 18th place.  Another San Remo entry in 1987 resulted in ninth place for "Come dentro un film", which was also the title of the first album he released for CBS in the same year.  He achieved his best San Remo placement to date in 1988 with "L'amore rubato" finishing third.

Eurovision Song Contest 
In 1988, Barbarossa was chosen by broadcaster RAI as the Italian Eurovision representative with the song "Vivo (Ti scrivo)" ("Alive (I Write to You)"). He went forward to the 33rd Eurovision Song Contest, held on 30 April in Dublin, where "Vivo (Ti scrivo)" finished in 12th place of 21 entries.

Later career 
Barbarossa won the 1992 San Remo Festival at his fifth attempt with "Portami a ballare", a song dedicated to his mother.  In the 1990s he released four studio albums and a live album.  In 1996 another San Remo entry with "Il ragazzo con la chitarra" placed 12th. A compilation album of his most popular songs, with two previously unreleased tracks, was issued in 2001.

Barbarossa's final San Remo participation to date came in 2003, with "Fortuna" finishing 10th.  He released an album of the same name that year, before putting his recording career on hold for four years.  He returned with a single, "Aspettavamo il 2000" in 2007, before releasing Via delle storie infinite, his first album for five years, in 2008.

San Remo Music Festival entries 
1981: "Roma spogliata" – 4th
1986: "Via Margutta" – 18th
1987: "Come dentro un film" – 9th
1988: "L'amore rubato" – 3rd
1992: "Portami a ballare" – 1st
1996: "Il ragazzo con la chitarra" – 12th
2003: "Fortuna" – 10th
2011: "Fino in fondo" Feat. Raquel del Rosario – 8th
2018: "Passame er sale" – 7th

Albums discography 
1981: Luca Barbarossa
1987: Come dentro un film
1988: Non tutti gli uomini
1989: Al di là del muro
1992: Cuore d'acciaio
1993: Vivo
1994: Le cose da salvare
1996: Sotto lo stesso cielo
1999: Musica e parole
2001: Viaggio di ritorno
2003: Fortuna
2008: Via delle storie infinite
2011: Barbarossa Social Club
2018: Roma è de tutti

References

External links 

  
 Myspace page

 

Italian male singers
Eurovision Song Contest entrants for Italy
Eurovision Song Contest entrants of 1988
Sanremo Music Festival winners
Singers from Rome
1961 births
Living people